Nuzuhath Shuaib (born 14 September 1988) is a Maldivian film actress.

Early life
Nuzuhath Shuaib was born on 14 September 1988 in N. Manadhoo. She was working at Jelly Pizza when her friend, a film actor Ali Azim introduced her to the team of Malikaa. Impressed with the brief meeting, she was roped in to play the title character in the film.

Career
Nuzuhath Shuaib made her film debut with Ali Musthafa-directed family drama Malikaa playing the titular role, Malikaa, a sidelined daughter who has been underappreciated for her doings while she manages to execute the whole responsibilities of the family. Featuring Ismail Zahir, Mohamed Jumayyil, Fathimath Azifa, Ahmed Asim, Ali Azim and Neena Saleem in prominent roles, the film met with mixed response from critics. Ahmed Nadheem, reviewing for Avas opined that "Shuaib's strong performance was an unforeseen circumstance in the film since such an acting was not predicted to be seen from her debut". Despite low expectations from trade analysts, the film performed moderately at the box office. She next featured alongside an ensemble cast including Yoosuf Shafeeu, Mohamed Manik, Ahmed Saeed and Ali Seezan in the comedy film Naughty 40 (2017) which was directed by Shafeeu. The film revolves around three friends, Ashwanee, Ahsan and Ajwad (Played by Shafeeu, Saeed and Manik respectively) who are single and having a youthful outlook, in spite of being in their forties. Aishath Maaha from Avas found her to be "good" and predicted her to "have a colorful career with meaty roles". The film met with both critical and commercial success, emerging as one of the highest grossing Maldivian films of the year. This followed with an item number in Abdul Fatthah's romantic drama Hahdhu (2017); a remixed version of the iconic song "Giritee Loabin".

In 2018, Shuaib was featured opposite Mohamed Jumayyil and Mariyam Majudha in Ali Shifau's family drama Vakin Loabin (2018). The film tells a story of a young couple’s divorce and its impact on everyone involved. Upon release, the film met with positive response from critics—specifically praising the screenplay for toning down its melodrama and breaking from the stereotypes of its genre—and was a commercial success. In a pre-premier review from Raajje.mv, Ismail Naail Nasheed favored the character development and minimised use of melodrama in the film while praising Nuzuhath Shuaibs's performance throughout the movie: "From acting to delivering the dialogues, she has mastered the art of expression to the like of any experienced actors. Her psychotic micro-expressions steal the limelight of this movie while proving that Shuaib perfectly delivered her character to the fullest".

Media image
In 2018, Mohamed was ranked in the tenth position from Dho?'s list of Top Ten Actresses of Maldives where writer Aishath Maaha opined that Mohamed is a "promising" actress who has left a big impact with her limited projects.

Filmography

Feature film

Television and web series

Accolades

References

External links
 

Living people
People from Malé
21st-century Maldivian actresses
Maldivian film actresses
1988 births